Nine Inch Nails is an American industrial rock act, founded in 1988 by Trent Reznor in Cleveland, Ohio. Since 1988, Nine Inch Nails has performed throughout the world, including tours in North America, South America, Europe, Oceania, and Asia.  During its earliest incarnations, Nine Inch Nails as a live band acted as supporting acts on tours for bands and musicians such as Skinny Puppy, The Jesus and Mary Chain, Peter Murphy, and Guns N' Roses. Subsequent tours have featured Nine Inch Nails as the headlining act, with support from bands such as Unkle, Marilyn Manson, Atari Teenage Riot, and A Perfect Circle.

Nine Inch Nails' live performances contrast with its in-studio counterpart.
Reznor writes and performs nearly all Nine Inch Nails studio material, with occasional instrumental and vocal contributions from others artists. However, Reznor has typically assembled groups of backing musicians to interpret songs for tours and other live performances.  The live-band lineup has changed constantly throughout the band's history, with frontman Reznor remaining the only constant on vocals and guitar, and long-time studio collaborator Atticus Ross officially joining in 2016. Notable musicians who have contributed to live performances include Chris Vrenna, Richard Patrick, Jeff Ward, James Woolley, Danny Lohner, Robin Finck, Charlie Clouser, Jerome Dillon, Alessandro Cortini, Josh Freese, and Ilan Rubin.

Pretty Hate Machine Tour Series (1988–1991)

Self-Destruct (1994–1996)

Fragility (1999–2000)

Live: With Teeth (2005–2006)

Performance 2007 (2007)

Lights in the Sky (2008)

 I The North American and South American legs overlapped in mid-October.

Wave Goodbye (2009)

Twenty Thirteen Tour (20132014)

The Trilogy Tour (2017–2018)

U.S. 2022 & U.K. 2022 (2022)

See also
List of Nine Inch Nails live-band members
Nine Inch Nails live performances

References

External links
Nine Inch Nails official site

 
Nine Inch Nails